Mansi Aggarwal is an Indian filmmaker, writer, producer and choreographer who has written, directed, produced films and choreographed songs in Indian film industry. She is best known for choreographing the song, "Bharat Mata ki Jai", from the movie Shanghai that starred actor Emraan Hashmi - the song gained a lot of popularity and became a hit in India. She has worked with path breaking actors - Priyanka Chopra in Mary Kom, Rajkumar Rao in Kai Po Che, and with Abhay Deol in the movie Dev D.

She has been nominated for the Filmfare award for the song "Bharat Mata ki Jai" from Shanghai starring the actor Emraan Hashmi, the song was loved by the audience and became popular in India. The song "Suno na Sangmarmar" from the movie Youngistaan was also nominated for Stardust and Filmfare awards.

She also choreographed commercials for big brands like Nykaa, Biba, Zandu Balm, etc. She was published as the youngest choreographer in the eminent magazine Femina.  In 2018, she made her debut as a writer-director with her first short film The Handbag, which was posted on ‘Humara Movie’ YouTube channel. She came with her second film Raani, which got selected for Lift Off Global Networks, London and was also screened at the Darbhanga International Film Festival. It was a finalist at the Golden Jury International Film Festival and won the Best Actor award at the same. Raani released on Disney Hotstar and is streaming on MX Player. The films The Handbag and Raani were produced under the banner Yin Yang Films.

Early life and career
Mansi was born on 10 June 1984 and raised in Delhi where she also took training in Indian classical dance, Kathak. Her Kathak training started when she was only 7 years old and she later became a Visharad (graduate) in the dance form. She studied Economics at Hansraj College in Delhi University and after finishing her graduation she opened her dance institute in Delhi—Mansi Dance Creations 

Her career in Bollywood movies started when she was first spotted by the film director, Anurag Kashyap, during a dance performance in Delhi. Anurag offered her to choreograph the critically acclaimed film, Gulaal. However, the movie got delayed and Mansi shifted her focus to academics until Anurag came to her for the second time with the proposal of choreographing Abhay Deol-starrer, Dev D.

Mansi is married to cinematographer Arindam Bhattacharjee.

Choreography in Indian Film Industry
Mansi has choreographed the following Bollywood movies:

Filmography as Director, Producer and Writer

References 

Living people
Indian women choreographers
Indian choreographers
Indian film choreographers
Women artists from Delhi
Dancers from Delhi
Indian female dancers
21st-century Indian women artists
21st-century Indian dancers
1984 births